is a private university in Yamaguchi, Yamaguchi, Japan.

External links
 Official website 

Private universities and colleges in Japan
Universities and colleges in Yamaguchi Prefecture